The 14th Dáil was elected at the 1951 general election on 30 May 1951 and met on 13 June 1951. The members of Dáil Éireann, the house of representatives of the Oireachtas (legislature), of Ireland are known as TDs. On 24 April 1954, President Seán T. O'Kelly dissolved the Dáil at the request of the Taoiseach Éamon de Valera. The 14th Dáil lasted  days.

Composition of the 14th Dáil

Fianna Fáil, denoted with a bullet, formed the 6th Government of Ireland.

Graphical representation
This is a graphical comparison of party strengths in the 14th Dáil from June 1951. This was not the official seating plan.

Ceann Comhairle
On the meeting of the Dáil, Patrick Hogan (Lab) was proposed as Ceann Comhairle by John A. Costello (FG) and seconded by Joseph Blowick (CnaT). His election was approved without a vote. Hogan had served as Leas-Cheann Comhairle from 1927 to 1928, from 1932 to 1938 and from 1948 to 1951.

TDs by constituency
The list of the 147 TDs elected is given in alphabetical order by Dáil constituency.

Changes

See also
Members of the 7th Seanad

References

External links
Houses of the Oireachtas: Debates: 14th Dáil

 
14
14th Dáil